Hadiabad (also Romanized as Hādīābād; also known as Gadiabad) is a village in Eqbal-e Gharbi Rural District, in the Central District of Qazvin County, Qazvin Province, Iran. At the 2006 census, its population was 588, in 121 families.

References 

Populated places in Qazvin County